Miesterhorst is a village and a former municipality in the district Altmarkkreis Salzwedel, in Saxony-Anhalt, Germany. Since 1 January 2011 it is part of the town of Gardelegen.

References

Former municipalities in Saxony-Anhalt
Gardelegen